The .22 Hornet or  5.6×35mmR is a varminting, small-game hunting, survival and competition centerfire rifle cartridge commercially introduced in 1930.  It is considerably more powerful than the rimfire .22 WMR and the .17 HMR, achieving higher velocity with a bullet twice the weight of the .17 HMR bullet. The Hornet also differs significantly from these in that being a centerfire cartridge makes it reloadable, and thus more versatile.  It was the smallest commercially available .22 caliber centerfire cartridge until the introduction of the FN 5.7×28mm.

The .22 Hornet fills the gap between such popular varmint/predator cartridges as the .22 WMR and the .223 Remington. In regard to muzzle velocity, muzzle energy and noise, it is well suited to vermin and predator control in relatively built-up areas.

History 
Prior to the development of the modern .22 Hornet, there was a conceptually similar but physically different cartridge by the same name invented in the 1890s by Reuben Harwood (nicknamed "Iron Ramrod)", sometimes called the ".22 Harwood Hornet" to avoid confusion, as the two rounds are not compatible. Harwood's cartridge was formed by necking down .25-20 brass to .22 caliber, and was initially loaded with black powder.

The modern .22 Hornet's ancestry is generally attributed to experiments done in the 1920s using the black-powder .22 WCF at Springfield Armory. Winchester adopted what had so far been a wildcat cartridge in 1930, producing ammo for a cartridge for which no commercially made guns yet had been built. It was not until 1932 that any company began selling commercially made guns for the cartridge.

Wildcat variants of the .22 Hornet, such as the .22 K-Hornet (designed by Lysle Kilbourn) and .22 Ackley Improved Hornet, can boost bullet velocity and energy considerably above factory .22 Hornet levels, but performance still falls short of what is deer-legal in the Netherlands or the United Kingdom, although it is legal for deer in some other countries and some American states.

Performance
Factory ammunition is widely available from all major manufacturers, with bullets generally weighing 34, 35, 45, or 46 grains (2.2, 2.3, 2.9, or 3.0 g), with bullets invariably either hollow point or soft point. Muzzle velocity typically is in the  range, and muzzle energy is just over 700 ft·lbf (950 J) for factory ammo fired from a rifle.  Velocities and energies are less when Hornet ammunition is fired from short-barreled firearms.

Published handload data from major handloading-product companies shows how versatile the .22 Hornet can be. According to the Hodgdon Powder Company reloading data, the heavier bullets show an affinity for Lil'Gun smokeless powder to produce much higher velocities than other powder with heavy bullets in this small case.

Applications

Survival
Beginning during World War II, aircrew survival rifles in .22 Hornet were developed and issued by the U.S. military.  They were a bolt-action rifle with collapsible stock (M4 Survival Rifle), a break-open rifle/shotgun over-under (M6 Aircrew Survival Weapon), and a takedown bolt-action rifle (AR-5/MA-1). Military survival issue .22 Hornet ammunition was loaded with soft-point expanding jacketed bullets, not complying with the Hague Convention. The United States was the only exception to a complete prohibition of the use of expanding bullets in war, due to its ambiguous policy. However, the cartridge boxes were labeled "Under no circumstances is the ammunition to be used for offensive or defensive measures against enemy personnel. This ammunition is provided for use with your emergency survival rifle for the killing of game for food under emergency survival conditions only."

Competition
The .22 Hornet is a popular cartridge for the Field/Hunter's pistol category in IHMSA and NRA metallic silhouette shooting.

Hunting

Survivalist Mel Tappan on the .22 Hornet: "It is accurate, has virtually no recoil and a light report.... [I]ts performance limits its use to small game and pests within 150 or 175 yards. It is by no means a reliable deer cartridge, even with handloads."

Sam Fadala of GUNS magazine calls it "perfect for mid-range varmints of all stripes," everything from small game, mountain birds (e.g., blue grouse), turkey, javelina, peccaries, coyote, and Australian wild pigs and goats.

The Hornet is considered an optimal cartridge for turkey hunting, though it is not as powerful as modern .22 centerfires. At mid-century, southern sportsman Henry Edwards Davis pronounced the Winchester Model 70 chambered for the Hornet "the best commercial rifle for wild turkeys the world has ever seen". In 2011, Lane Kinney was awarded the "Top Turkey in the World" award by Safari Club International for a record-setting Osceola turkey taken with a T/C Contender pistol in .22 Hornet.

The Hornet's virtual absence of recoil has made it even quite popular among deer hunters in some areas, although it is generally regarded as very underpowered for deer unless bullet placement is absolutely precise. American hunter Jack O'Connor decried this practice in the 1950s, stating the Hornet could "under no circumstances" be considered a deer cartridge. Many jurisdictions such as the Netherlands, the UK (other than England and Wales)  and some states in the USA currently prohibit the Hornet (and other .22 caliber cartridges) for use on deer.

The .22 Hornet also proved popular among the Alaskan Inuit due to low cost, who used it for hunting seals, caribou, and even polar bears.

Firearms
  
Rifles are currently (2007) being chambered in .22 Hornet by Ruger, New England Firearms, CZ and various other mass-market manufacturers. Most current-production rifles in .22 Hornet are either bolt-action or single-shot designs, with the exception of a very few "survival" rifle/shotgun over-under designs such as the Savage Model 24 from Savage and a few European-made kipplauf break-action, single-shot rifles. Older guns generally have a slower twist rate of 1-16" (or one turn in every  of barrel length) for lighter bullets with a .223 caliber dimension. Newer guns feature a faster 1-14" twist in the .224 bore diameter.

Revolvers have been produced in .22 Hornet by Taurus, Magnum Research, and others. Single-shot pistols in .22 Hornet have been made by Thompson Center Arms. Muzzle velocities are somewhat less for this cartridge in short-barreled handguns than in rifles.

See also 
 .17 Hornet
 5 mm caliber
 List of rifle cartridges
 Sectional density
 Table of handgun and rifle cartridges

References

Further reading

External links 

 Chuck Hawks .22 Hornet Page
 .22 Hornet article in Petersen's Hunting
 Cartridge Dimensions at Steves Pages

Pistol and rifle cartridges
Winchester Repeating Arms Company cartridges